Has God Forsaken Africa? (original French title: Dieu a-t-il quitté l’Afrique?) is a Canadian 2008 documentary film.

Synopsis 
Brussels, August 1999. Two teenagers from Guinea are found dead in the landing gear of a plane arriving from Conakry. Each year, thousands of young Africans risk their lives to flee the African continent. Shocked by this phenomenon, the Senegalese-born director Musa Dieng Kala returns to Dakar to try to understand why they do it. He films five young adults seeking to immigrate to the West at any cost reflecting the international indifference, the indifference of the African leaders and a society with no resources.

Awards 
SCIC Global Issues Award, Yorkton Film Festival, 2009
Bank of Africa Special Prize, Panafrican Film and Television Festival of Ouagadougou, Burkina Faso, 2009
AQCC Award for the Best Short or Medium Length Documentary, Rendez-vous du cinéma québécois, 2009

References

External links
Watch Has God Forsaken Africa? at the National Film Board of Canada

2008 films
National Film Board of Canada documentaries
2008 documentary films
Documentary films about immigration
Films shot in Senegal
Dakar
Documentary films about Africa
2000s Canadian films